Walter Weber (26 March 1907 in Gelsenkirchen – 18 July 1944 in German-occupied Kościan) was a German pioneer of electromagnetic sound recording.

From 1925 to 1927 he studied at the Oldenburg Academy of Engineering. From 1 May 1928 to 31 December 1930 he was an engineer at the central laboratory of Siemens & Halske AG in Berlin. There he met Hans-Joachim von Braunmühl. When he moved to the laboratory of the Reichs-Rundfunk-Gesellschaft, he followed him there in 1931. On 2 November 1938, he defended his thesis Das Schallspektrum von Knallfunken und Knallpistolen mit einem Beitrag über Anwendungsmöglichkeiten in der elektroakustischen Meßtechnik. (The sound spectrum of spark transmitters and oscillators with a contribution on possible applications in electroacoustic measuring technology), .

On 18 April 1940 the pair re-invented RF bias (HFVM), and on 10 June that year they exhibited their "HF magnetophone" at the Ufa Palace cinema in Berlin.

References
Funkschau 44 / 7–8 / 53: "Oberingenieur Dr. Walter Weber zum Gedächtnis".
Hans Joachim von Braunmühl. "Oberingenieur Dr. Weber zum Gedächtnis". Reichsrundfunk, 9/10. Issue 1944/45, August 1944, p. 110

External links
Friedrich Karl Engel, "Walter Weber's Technical Innovation at the Reichs-Rundfunk-Gesellschaft"

1907 births
1944 deaths
German electrical engineers
People from Gelsenkirchen
Engineers from North Rhine-Westphalia